Alex Perolli (December 7, 1915 – March 19, 1994) was an Albanian football coach best known for coaching the Los Angeles Aztecs to a North American Soccer League championship in 1974. The following season, he coached the San Antonio Thunder for 9 games before being fired, having won only one match.

In 1955, Perolli coached the Italy U23. In 1970, he coached the Rochester Lancers for 13 games before leaving midway through the season. He coached the Mexican side Vera Cruz in 1973 before taking the helm of the expansion Aztecs the following year. On 25 September 1974, Perolli was name head coach of the San Antonio Thunder.  He returned to the Lancers a decade later 8 games into the 1980 season. In 1961, he coached Montreal Cantalia in the Eastern Canada Professional Soccer League, and later with Montreal Concordia which played a dual season in the International Soccer League and National Soccer League. In 1969, he was the head coach for Toronto Hellas in the National Soccer League. He had another run in the NSL in 1976 with the Buffalo Blazers.

References

1915 births
1994 deaths
Footballers from Tirana
Albanian footballers
Association football forwards
SK Sturm Graz players
Albanian expatriate footballers
Expatriate footballers in Austria
Albanian expatriate sportspeople in Austria
Albanian football managers
North American Soccer League (1968–1984) coaches
Expatriate soccer managers in the United States
C.D. Veracruz managers
Expatriate soccer managers in Canada
Expatriate football managers in Mexico
Albanian expatriate sportspeople in Canada
Albanian expatriate sportspeople in Mexico
Albanian expatriate sportspeople in the United States
Canadian National Soccer League coaches